
Gmina Rojewo is a rural gmina (administrative district) in Inowrocław County, Kuyavian-Pomeranian Voivodeship, in north-central Poland.

Villages
Gmina Rojewo contains the villages and settlements of Bród Kamienny, Budziaki, Dąbie, Dąbrowa Mała, Dobiesławice, Glinki, Glinno Wielkie, Jarki, Jaszczołtowo, Jezuicka Struga, Jurańcice, Leśnianki, Liszkowice, Liszkowo, Łążyn, Łukaszewo, Magdaleniec, Mierogonowice, Osieczek, Osiek Wielki, Płonkówko, Płonkowo, Rojewice, Rojewo, Ściborze, Stara Wieś, Topola, Wybranowo, Zawiszyn and Żelechlin.

Neighbouring gminas
Gmina Rojewo is bordered by the gminas of Gniewkowo, Inowrocław, Nowa Wieś Wielka, Solec Kujawski, Wielka Nieszawka and Złotniki Kujawskie.

References
Polish official population figures 2006

Inowrocław County